Steven "Steve" Scott (born 10 January 1985) is a British shooter.

Career
He won a gold medal in the 2010 Commonwealth Games held from 3–14 October 2010 in Delhi, India, and a bronze medal in the 2016 Summer Olympics.

Scott was born in Lewisham, and lives in Battle, East Sussex. With Stevan Walton, he won the men's double trap pairs event on 6 October 2010.

References

External links

1985 births
Living people
English male sport shooters
People from Lewisham
People from Battle, East Sussex
Shooters at the 2010 Commonwealth Games
Commonwealth Games gold medallists for England
Shooters at the 2015 European Games
European Games competitors for Great Britain
Shooters at the 2016 Summer Olympics
Medalists at the 2016 Summer Olympics
Olympic bronze medallists for Great Britain
Olympic shooters of Great Britain
Olympic medalists in shooting
Commonwealth Games medallists in shooting
Medallists at the 2010 Commonwealth Games